The Korea Music Content Association (KMCA) was established in 2008, with the purpose of promoting the professional interests of its members, as well as being involved in anti-piracy. It introduced the first official South Korean music charts in 2010, and implemented record certifications in April 2018—only releases subsequent to January 1, 2018 would be eligible once they fulfilled the required thresholds. Releases prior to that date cannot receive certification.

Since 2018, 189 albums have been certified by the KMCA in South Korea. Got7's Eyes on You, NCT's NCT 2018 Empathy, and Wanna One's 0+1=1 (I Promise You) were the first to be certified, on May 5 of that year. The following month, Twice's What Is Love? (2018) became the first album by a female act to receive a certification. Blackpink's debut studio album The Album became the first by a girl group to receive Million certification, in 2020, while their second studio album Born Pink became the first to receive Double Million certification, in 2022. Baekhyun's third EP Bambi (2021) is the first album by a solo artist to receive Million certification. Boy band Stray Kids has the most-certified albums overall, with twelve.

As of January 2023, South Korea's highest-certified record is Map of the Soul: 7 (2020), the fourth studio album of boy band BTS. The record was awarded quintuple million certification in November 2022, for selling over five million units.

Certification levels

By units

See also 

 List of best-selling albums in South Korea
 List of certified songs in South Korea
 List of music recording certifications

Notes

References

South Korea
South Korean music-related lists
South Korea albums